The fifth season of the American reality competition streaming series The Circle premiered on Netflix on December 28, 2022. Michelle Buteau returned as host. The season is the first to have a subtitle, known as The Circle Singles. Players compete without ever actually meeting in person; they communicate through a simulated social media interface, portraying themselves in any way they choose.

Format 

The players move into the same apartment building. However, the contestants do not meet face-to-face during the course of the competition, as they each live in their own individual apartment. They communicate solely using their profiles on a specially-designed social media app that gives them the ability to portray themselves in any way they choose. Players can thus opt to present themselves as a completely different personality to the other players, a tactic otherwise known as catfishing.

Throughout the series, the contestants "rate" one another from first to last place. At the end of the ratings, their average ratings are revealed to one another from lowest to highest. Normally, the two highest-rated players become "Influencers", while the remaining players will be at risk of being "blocked" by the Influencers. However, occasionally there may be a twist to the blocking process – varying from the lowest rating players being instantly blocked, the identity of the Influencers being a secret, or multiple players being blocked at one time. Blocked players are eliminated from the game, but are given the opportunity to meet one player still in the game in-person. Then, the day after a blocking, a video message is shown to the remaining players to reveal if they were real or fake.

Also, fans of The Circle are able to vote for their favorite player. The player that receives the most votes is known as the Fan Favorite and receives .

Production

Development and release 
The season was announced on August 9, 2021 when Netflix renewed The Circle for a fourth and fifth season prior the premiere of the third season. Michelle Buteau, who hosted the first four seasons, returned for the fifth.

Casting and filming 
Filming for the season took place directly after principal photography for the fourth season, in Fall 2021 at an apartment complex in Manchester, England. The same complex that was used during previous seasons and other versions of the series. The apartment complex is prepared with twelve furnished and ready-to-use apartments for the players to live in.

After the third season began airing, casting for the fourth and fifth seasons opened on April 12, 2021. The initial members of the cast were revealed on December 9, 2022.

Players 

For the first time in the history of the show, the casting process only included those who consider themselves not in a relationship or those who want to portray themselves as not in a relationship. The first twelve contestants were announced on December 9, 2022. Among the cast is Brett Robinson, a contestant from Big Brother 20, the first deaf contestant Raven Sutton and her interpreter Paris McTizic and the first returning player, with season one runner-up Shubham Goel. 

Marvin Achi was announced as a contestant prematurely after being removed from the cast of Big Brother 24, after failing to inform the producers of Big Brother that he had competed on The Circle. He had also participated in America's Got Talent.

Other appearances 
Brett Robinson appeared in the 20th season of Big Brother.

Marvin Achi appeared in the first season of the joint Nigerian/South African edition of Big Brother, titled Big Brother Titans representing Nigeria.

Episodes

Results and elimination 

 Notes
  Prior to the ratings reveal, each player was tasked with stating who they would block from the Circle if they were an influencer. Being in the top two spots, Raven chose Brett while Chaz chose Xanthi, forcing Brett and Xanthi to be blocked from the Circle.
   After being blocked, Brett and Xanthi were given an opportunity to return to the game under a new profile known as "Jennifer".
   Prior to their influencer discussion, Chaz chose to save Sam and Raven chose to save Marvin from elimination.
  "Sasha" and "Tamira" competed in a mission to gain more followers; Tamira and her group won, gaining immunity from the blocking , while Sasha was forced to block one of the remaining players .
  The players' ratings were not revealed, instead the highest rated player would become a superinfluencer. Chaz placed the highest.
  The players made their final ratings.

References 

2022 American television seasons
2023 American television seasons
The Circle (franchise)